Dogwood is an unincorporated community in northwestern Douglas County, Missouri, United States.

History
In 1879, a Civil War veteran built a log store building and home near a spring surrounded by dogwoods along the route of the Springfield–Rockbridge portion of the old Salt Road along which salt, lumber and other materials had long been transported between northern Arkansas and Springfield. A post office was established at Dogwood in 1880 and remained in service until 1909. A school was established in 1888 and a log school building was built north of the store in 1891 and was replaced by a frame building in 1910.

In 1900, a missionary began holding church services in the school building. In 1905, a church building was erected and land was set aside for a cemetery. In 1932, due to widening and re-routing of Route 14, the church was moved to its current location north of the cemetery. In 1904, a second church was built north of the store and in 1931, a third church was built to the southeast on Route 14.

Geography

References

Unincorporated communities in Douglas County, Missouri
1879 establishments in Missouri
Unincorporated communities in Missouri